Testimony is a book that was published in October 1979 by the Russian musicologist Solomon Volkov. He claimed that it was the memoirs of the composer Dmitri Shostakovich. From its publication, its portrayal of the composer and his views was controversial: the Shostakovich of the book was sometimes critical of fellow composers, and most notably was strongly anti-Soviet in his views. The book also contained comments on his own music, indicating that it was intended as veiled criticism of the Soviet authorities and support for the dissident movement. The authenticity of the book is still disputed.

Volkov's claim

Volkov said that Shostakovich dictated the material in the book at a series of meetings with him between 1971 and 1974. Volkov took notes at each meeting, transcribed and edited the material, and presented it to the composer at their next meeting. Shostakovich then signed the first page of each chapter. Unfortunately it is difficult without access to Volkov's original notes (claimed to be lost) to ascertain where Shostakovich possibly ends and Volkov possibly begins.

Original manuscript

The original typescript of Testimony has never been made available for scholarly investigation. After it was photocopied by Harper and Row, it was returned to Volkov who kept it in a Swiss bank until it was "sold to an anonymous private collector" in the late 1990s. Harper and Row made several changes to the published version, and illicitly circulating typescripts reflect various intermediate stages of the editorial process.

Despite translation into 30 different languages, the Russian original has never been published. Dmitry Feofanov stated at the local meeting of the American Musicological Society in 1997 how publishing contracts customarily vest copyright and publication rights in a publisher, and not an author. Assuming Volkov signed a standard contract, he would have no say whatsoever in whether an edition in this or that language appears; such decisions would be made by his publisher.

That was why a group of anonymous Russian translators had translated the book from English into Russian and published it in network in 2009. In their foreword they wrote:

Recycled material

Questions regarding the book were raised by Laurel Fay first in 1980 and reiterated in 2002. She found that passages at the beginning of eight of the chapters duplicate almost verbatim material from articles published as Shostakovich's between 1932 and 1974. From the typescripts available to her, the only pages signed by Shostakovich consist entirely of this material verbatim and down to the punctuation. No other pages are signed and no other pages contain similarly recycled material. Quotations break off one word past each page break and then significantly change in tone and character (more readily apparent in the unpublished Russian). Critics of the book suggest Volkov persuaded Shostakovich to sign each page containing the composer's own material, before attaching fabricated material of Volkov's own. This claim could be investigated by studying the paper leaves of the original typescript, but Volkov has strictly prohibited such an investigation.

Supporters of the book's authenticity offer two explanations for the recycled material. First, they assert Shostakovich's profound musical memory allowed him to recite long passages verbatim. Secondly, they note that not all the pages which Shostakovich signed are of recycled material. In particular, he signed the first page of the book, which contains unrecycled and controversial material, as well the first page of the third chapter.

The two extra signatures were addressed by Fay in her 2002 book. According to her, Shostakovich did not sign the first page of the typescript. His signature is only found on the third page, which again consists entirely of recycled material. However, when Henry Orlov examined the original manuscript in August, 1979, he stated that all the signatures were in the first pages of the chapters:

Fay did not examine the original typescript but probably an edited copy distributed illicitly by the Finnish translator of Testimony, Seppo Heikinheimo.

Important also is the way Volkov claims to have assembled the manuscript. As he writes in the preface to Testimony, Volkov's interviews with Shostakovich consisted of questions to which the composer provided "brief" and "reluctant" answers, and which Volkov compiled in a "mound of shorthand notes."  These fragmented notes were then "divided up [and] combined as seemed appropriate." Thus, even if we accept that Shostakovich had a photographic memory, we are still left with the notion that Volkov transcribed the composer's memories in personal shorthand, shuffled and re-shuffled these "penciled scribbles" (Volkov's term), and managed to reproduce entire paragraphs of previously published material verbatim, right down to the original typography and layout. Such things as blacked out passages, passages pasted over, and passages covered by correction tape in the circulated and photocopied typescripts could be reconstructed or investigated by an examination of the original typescript, which has been strictly prohibited by the author.

Shostakovich and Volkov

A second argument against the book is that Volkov did not meet Shostakovich often enough to have received the material. Shostakovich's widow, Irina, has stated that Volkov met him only three or four times. His ill-health at the time meant that she rarely left him, so that she would have known about any other meetings.

However, some other witnesses support Volkov's version. In particular, the composer's friend Flora Litvinova recalls Shostakovich saying, in reference to an unnamed Leningrad musicologist (Volkov was from Leningrad): "We now meet constantly, and I tell him everything I remember about my works and myself. He writes it down, and at a subsequent meeting I look it over."

Maxim Shostakovich has also commented on Testimony and Volkov more favourably since 1991, when the Soviet regime fell. To Allan B. Ho and Dmitry Feofanov, he confirmed that his father had told him about "meeting a young man from Leningrad [Volkov] who knows his music extremely well" and that "Volkov did meet with Shostakovich to work on his reminiscences". Maxim emphasized repeatedly: "I am a supporter both of Testimony and of Volkov."

Friends' attitudes

Each side of the debate has amassed statements opposing or supporting the book's authenticity. In 1979, a letter condemning the book was signed by six of the composer's acquaintances: Veniamin Basner, Kara Karayev, Yury Levitin, Karen Khachaturian, Boris Tishchenko and Mieczysław Weinberg. Initially, the book was also criticised by the composer's son, Maxim, but later he and his sister Galina have become supporters of Volkov. The widow Irina continues to reject the book.

Supporters of the book discount the statements of those who were still in the USSR at the time as extorted or fabricated. They point to endorsements of the book by emigres and after the fall of the USSR, including Maxim and Galina Shostakovich.

However, endorsing the factuality of the book does not necessarily mean endorsing it as what it claims to be, i.e., the authenticated memoirs of Dmitri Shostakovich. For instance, Maxim Shostakovich has said that the book gives a true picture of the political situation in the USSR and correctly represents his father's political views, but continues to speak of the book as being "about my father, not by him". In 1980, after defecting from the USSR, he denied the book was his father's memoirs.

Others who endorse the book are not necessarily even aware of the questions about Shostakovich's signatures raised by Laurel Fay (see above, Recycled material) and therefore their competence in judging the book's authenticity as Shostakovich's memoirs (as opposed to its factual authenticity) is in question. Also, they include musicians whose personal acquaintance with Shostakovich was extremely limited (e.g., Vladimir Ashkenazy).

The claim that the condemnation of the book by the six Soviet composers was extorted or fabricated is also questionable. None of the five composers who were still living in the 1990s has disassociated himself from the condemnation after the fall of the USSR. Kara Karayev died in 1982, but his son Faradzh Karayev has testified in 1999 that his father had read the German translation of Testimony and told his family that "Mitya [Dmitri Shostakovich] couldn't have written this, let alone allowed its publication. It is clearly a fabrication". (This claim is also supported by Kara Karayev's diary entries from the same period.) In an article written in the same year, "The Regime and Vulgarity", Elena Basner has told that her father Veniamin Basner, Mieczysław Weinberg (both of whom died in 1996), and Boris Tishchenko were also acquainted with (and indignant about) the book before signing the condemnation.

As a translator of Testimony, the Finnish musicologist Seppo Heikinheimo (1938–1997) had a copy of the Russian-language manuscript of Testimony in his possession, and he claims that he showed the text to dozens of Russian musicians, many of whom knew Shostakovich. According to Heikinheimo, Mstislav Rostropovich (in 1979) considered that Testimony is authentic, as did Rudolf Barshai, Kirill Kondrashin, Yuri Lyubimov, Gidon Kremer, Emil Gilels, and Sviatoslav Richter.

Significance of the debate

There is no necessary connection between accepting Testimony's provenance and accepting that Shostakovich was a dissident, or vice versa. The spectrum of opinion on these issues includes some who believe that Volkov may have faked Testimony, but that it accurately reflects Shostakovich's views (e.g. Elizabeth Wilson). They point to the fact that Volkov is known to have met with Shostakovich, and that he could have obtained further accurate information from other of the composer's acquaintances. Musicologist Richard Taruskin stated that "Volkov’s book (despite the seductive, still widely believed stories it promulgates) has been exposed as a mixture of recycled material that Shostakovich had approved for republication and fabrications that were inserted after his death."

The success of Testimony influenced skeptical reception to the forged Hitler Diaries perpetrated by the forger Konrad Kujau with the complicity of journalist and communist spy Gerd Heidemann in 1983, one of the greatest scandals in modern journalism. Like Testimony, the Hitler Diaries were authenticated by an "expert" hired by a reputable publishing firm. After Testimony, the public demanded examination of the original materials by a credible party.

Movie

Testimony: The Story of Shostakovich is a 1987 British drama film, based on the book, directed by Tony Palmer and starring Ben Kingsley as Shostakovich.

Notes

Further reading
 Brown, Malcolm Hamrick (ed.): A Shostakovich Casebook. Indiana University Press 2004. 
 Fay, Laurel: Shostakovich versus Volkov: Whose Testimony? – The Russian Review, Vol. 39 No. 4 (October 1980), pp. 484–493.
 Ho, Allan B. and Feofanov, Dmitry (ed.): Shostakovich Reconsidered. Toccata Press 1998. 
 Ho, Allan B. and Feofanov, Dmitry (ed.): The Shostakovich Wars. 2011. PDF
 Litvinova, Flora: "Vspominaya Shostakovicha" [Remembering Shostakovich]. In Znamya (The Banner), December 1996, pp. 156–177. (In Russian.)
 MacDonald, Ian: The New Shostakovich. Pimlico (2006). 
 Volkov, Solomon: Shostakovich and Stalin: The Extraordinary Relationship Between the Great Composer and the Brutal Dictator. Knopf 2004.

External links
 
 
 Testimony. D. D. Shostakovich's memoirs, written and edited by Solomon Volkov.

1979 non-fiction books
Political autobiographies
Dmitri Shostakovich
Autobiographies adapted into films